John A. Bolger Jr. (May 22, 1908 – August 22, 1990) was an American sound engineer. He was nominated for an Academy Award in the category Best Sound for the film The Hindenburg.

Selected filmography
 The Hindenburg (1975; co-nominated with Leonard Peterson, John L. Mack and Don Sharpless)

References

External links

1990 deaths
American audio engineers
1908 births
20th-century American engineers
Deaths from pneumonia in California